Frederick Gilbert Gardiner Jellicoe (24 February 1858 – 29 July 1927) was an English first-class cricketer who played as a right-handed batsman and bowled left-arm roundarm slow-medium. He was the elder brother of Admiral of the Fleet John Jellicoe, 1st Earl Jellicoe.

Educated at Haileybury College and New College, Oxford, Jellicoe made his first-class debut for Oxford University against the Marylebone Cricket Club in 1877 and played 14 matches for Oxford University, the last of which came against the Marylebone Cricket Club in 1880. Jellicoe was a poor batsman, scoring just 21 runs and an average of 1.31. With his roundarm bowling Jellicoe took 55 wickets at the brilliant average of 16.74, with career best figures of 8/36 against the Gentlemen of England in 1879.

Jellicoe also represented Hampshire in one match in 1877. He made his debut against Derbyshire. Jellicoe represented Hampshire in three further first-class matches in 1880, two against the Marylebone Cricket Club with his final first-class match coming against local rivals Sussex. His batting average was much improved when playing for Hampshire, where Jellicoe scored 37 runs at an average of 9.25. His bowling for the county yielded 23 wickets at the average of 10.56, including 7/23 against the Marylebone Cricket Club.

After leaving university, Jellicoe taught at St Edward's School, Oxford for 10 years before being ordained as a Church of England clergyman. He served at various parishes in Hampshire. He died at Guy's Hospital, Southwark, London on 29 July 1927.

References

External links
Frederick Jellicoe on Cricinfo
Frederick Jellicoe on CricketArchive
Matches and detailed statistics for Frederick Jellicoe

1858 births
1927 deaths
Cricketers from Southampton
English cricketers
Oxford University cricketers
Hampshire cricketers
People educated at Haileybury and Imperial Service College
Alumni of New College, Oxford
Schoolteachers from Hampshire
19th-century English Anglican priests